is a private eikaiwa English  conversation school run by  started primarily in western Japan for children from three months to 14 years old. It now has schools all over Japan from Hokkaido to Okinawa. As of March, 2019, Seiha has 743 classrooms all around Japan and is employing more than 2,000 teachers. Students enrolled in Seiha's English Network recently passed the 50,000 student mark which makes Seiha the largest children's English School in Japan.

Teaching style
Native-English speaking teachers co-teach in tandem with native-Japanese teachers. Seiha's curriculum includes Total Physical Response-style teaching.

Mascot
The academy's mascot is 'say hello', an anthropomorphic yellow bear dressed as a postman.

References

External links
  

English conversation schools in Japan